Lasse Brandeby (27 April 1945 – 20 November 2011) was a Swedish actor, comedian and journalist.

Biography 
Brandeby was born in the Majorna district of Gothenburg.  After receiving his degree in journalism he worked for Radio Sjuhärad. He debuted as an actor in the early 1980s on Nationalteatern in Gothenburg. He was best known for his quirky character Kurt Olsson, around whom several TV-shows and one feature film were made in the 1980s and 1990s. He was also known for his other comedic character Rolf Allan Mjunstedt in the TV series Rena rama Rolf, a Swedish language adaptation of The Honeymooners, where audiences also saw the breakthrough of comedian Robert Gustafsson.

During early 2007 he participated in the Swedish TV show Let's Dance with dance partner Ann Lähdet where he failed to reach the final three.

Brandeby died in Gothenburg on 20 November 2011 after suffering from prostate cancer, 66 years old.

References

External links

1945 births
2011 deaths
Swedish comedians
Swedish journalists
People from Gothenburg
20th-century Swedish male actors
21st-century Swedish male actors